

Alois Stoeckl (also referred to as Alois Stöckl; 22 August 1895  – 14 August 1940) was a German pilot during World War II who commanded the 55th Bomber Wing of the Luftwaffe.  He was a recipient of the Knight's Cross of the Iron Cross of Nazi Germany.

Alois Stoeckl was killed on 14 August 1940 after the Heinkel He 111 that he was an observer in was attacked by British Spitfires from No. 609 Squadron RAF. He was shot down by British pilot John Dundas DFC. Stoeckl and two of his crew were buried at the Cannock Chase German Military Cemetery.

Awards and decorations

 Knight's Cross of the Iron Cross on 4 July 1940 as Oberst and commander of Kampfgeschwader 55

References

Citations

Bibliography

 

1895 births
1940 deaths
People from Mühldorf
German World War II bomber pilots
Luftstreitkräfte personnel
Condor Legion personnel
Luftwaffe personnel killed in World War II
Recipients of the clasp to the Iron Cross, 1st class
German military personnel of the Spanish Civil War
Recipients of the Knight's Cross of the Iron Cross
People from the Kingdom of Bavaria
Aviators killed by being shot down
German police officers
Military personnel from Bavaria
Burials at Cannock Chase German Military Cemetery